Yang Baosen (9 October 1909 – 10 February 1958) was a Peking opera singer.


Life
Yang was best known for his "old man" roles  lǎoshēng) and was considered one of Peking Opera's "Four Great Beards"   , along with Tan Fuying, Ma Lianliang, and Xi Xiaobo. He served as a mentor to Li Yuru.

References

Citations

Bibliography
 .

External links
"杨宝森" on Baike.com 

1909 births
1958 deaths
20th-century Chinese male actors
Chinese male Peking opera actors
20th-century Chinese  male singers
Singers from Beijing
Male actors from Beijing